The Haute Route (or the High Route or Mountaineers' Route) is the name given to a route (with several variations) undertaken on foot or by ski touring between the Mont Blanc in Chamonix, France,  and the Matterhorn, in Zermatt, Switzerland.

First charted as a summer mountaineering route by members of the English Alpine Club in the mid-19th century, the route takes around 12+ days walking (or 7+ days skiing) for the 180 km from the Chamonix valley, home of Mont Blanc, to Zermatt, home of the Matterhorn. Originally dubbed "The High Level Route" in English by members of the hiking club, the term was translated into French when first successfully undertaken on skis in 1911. Since then the French term has prevailed. While the term haute route has become somewhat genericized for any of the many multi-day, hut-to-hut alpine tours, the "Chamonix-Zermatt Haute Route" remains the original.

Besides the original Haute Route, there is nowadays also a "Walker's" Haute Route, which is an alpine hiking trail that follows a network of well-marked and signposted paths. The "Walker's" route stays below 3000 meters and takes advantage of the popular mountain huts and small inns and hotels in the villages along the way. In the spring, summer and fall, this route is safe, entirely non-technical (requires no ropes, crampons, or protection devices, unlike the actual Haute Route) and while challenging because of its daily elevation gains and distances, is achievable by any hiker in reasonably good physical condition.

The original Haute Route has large portions of glacier travel, for which suitable mountaineering gear and experience is necessary.  In the winter, ski touring gear is required, and depending upon the weather and route chosen, may require crampons, ropes and avalanche protection gear.

Summer Haute Routes
There is occasionally a danger of collapsing glaciers which can render the path virtually impassable.  However, a lower level variation exists that avoids crossing glaciers.  The majority of hikers complete it in 12–16 days

Huts and villages on the summer Haute Route glacier trek
Le Tour village, France
Albert Premier Hut
Cabane du Trient or Orny Hut
Champex town, Switzerland
Valsorey Hut or Chanrion Hut
Vignettes Hut
Arolla village, Switzerland
Bertol Hut
Schonbiel Hut
Zermatt town, Switzerland

Low level "Walker's Haute Route" variation huts and villages
Chamonix town, France
Argentière village, France
Trient village, Switzerland
Champex village, Switzerland
Sembrancher village, Switzerland
Le Chable village, Switzerland
Verbier village, Switzerland
Arolla village, Switzerland
Les Haudères village, Switzerland
Zinal village, Switzerland
Gruben village, Switzerland
St Niklaus village, Switzerland
Zermatt town, Switzerland

Ski Touring Haute Route

First successfully completed in 1911, the Haute Route ski tour is probably the most famous and coveted ski tour in the world. Using high mountain huts to allow skiers to stay high and cover substantial distances, it winds through the highest, most dramatic peaks of the Alps from Mont Blanc to the Matterhorn. It requires good weather, favourable snow conditions and strong effort to complete this line. Because of this, roughly half of the skiers who begin the tour do not complete it.

There are many variations of the HLR (High Level Route) that work their way between Chamonix and Zermatt, including those listed below. It is also possible to add ascents of a number of ski peaks to any of the routes. The winter Haute Route deviates from the summer route to avoid terrain that is dangerous or impassable when snow-covered. Many people also ski the Haute Route in the opposite direction, by variations that select better ascent and descents.

Lionel Claudepierre, a member of PGHM of Bourg Saint Maurice, set a new record of 18h35m on Monday 15 April 2013.

Classic Route 
The winter Haute Route's original line which involves long climbs and mountaineering with ice axe and crampons.
Day 1: Argentiere village, France, over the Col du Chardonnet and the Fenêtre du Saleina to the Trient Hut.
Day 2: Champex-Lac via the Val d'Arpette. Bus or taxi to Bourg-Saint-Pierre.
Day 3: Long climb up to the Valsorey Hut on the shoulder of Grand Combin.
Day 4: Over the Plateau du Couloir and down the Glacier du Mont Durand to the Chanrion Hut.
Day 5: A long climb up the Otemma Glacier to the Vignettes Hut.
Day 6: A long day to Zermatt over the Col de l'Evêque, Col du Mont Brulé and Col de Valpelline, then a long descent under the shoulder of the Matterhorn and Dent d'Herens.
Day 7: Optional extension to Saas-Fee over the Adler Pass.

Verbier Variation 
The purest skiing line, and the most frequently done.
Day 1: Argentière, France, over the Col du Chardonnet and the Fenêtre du Saleina to the Trient Hut.
Day 2: Champex-Lac via the Val d'Arpette. Bus or taxi to Verbier and the Mont Fort Hut.
Day 3: Over the Rosablanche to the Prafleuri Hut.
Day 4: Around Dixence reservoir and up to the Dix Hut.
Day 5: Over the Pigne d'Arolla to the Vignettes Hut.
Day 6: A long day to Zermatt over the Col de l'Evêque, Col du Mont Brulé and Col de Valpelline, then a long descent under the shoulder of the Matterhorn and Dent d'Herens.
Day 7: Optional extension to Saas-Fee over the Adler Pass.

Grande Lui variation 
A longer, harder, more technical route that eliminates the road break of the Verbier and Classic variations.
Day 1: Argentiere village, France, over the Col du Chardonnet and the Fenêtre du Saleina to the Trient Hut or down to the Bivouac Dorés.
Day 2: Over the Grande Lui through the Col du Saleina or around it via the Swiss Three Cols and a long descent to the village of La Fouly.
Day 3: Up the Val Ferret and over to Grand St. Bernard Hospice.
Day 4: Down to Great St Bernard Pass and over the shoulder of Mont Vélan to the Vélan Hut.
Day 5: Up the Grand Combin and over the Plateau du Couloir, down the Glacier du Mont Durand to the Chanrion Hut.
Day 6: A long non-technical climb up the Otemma Glacier or a stiffer climb over Les Portons to the Vignettes Hut.
Day 7: A long day to Zermatt over the Col de l'Evêque, Col du Mont Brulé and Col de Valpelline, then a long descent under the shoulder of the Matterhorn and Dent d'Herens.
Day 8: Optional extension to Saas-Fee over the Adler Pass.

"Backward" Haute Route
Day 1: From Zermatt under the Matterhorn up to the Schonbiel Hut.
Day 2: Over the Col de Valpelline and up to the Bertol Hut.
Day 3: Down then up over Col Collon to the Vignettes Hut.
Day 4: Over the Pigne d'Arolla and down Les Portons to Chanrion Hut.
Day 5: Across the Otemma Gorge, up & over into the Aosta Valley. Hitchhike to La Palud.
Day 6: Ride the lift to the Vallée Blanche. Descend to Montenvers and ski or take the cog train out to Chamonix.

Peaks and passes on the route
See the route descriptions.

Optional ski peak ascents along the listed Haute Route variations include the Mont Blanc, Rosablanche, Pigne d'Arolla, Mont Blanc de Cheilon, Mont Vélan, Breithorn. Some of these peak ascents will require an additional day or more, and range from easy to very technical and difficult.

See also
 Haute Route (cycling)
 Swiss Alps

Notes

References

 Updates are available on the publisher's website.

Further reading
 . (In French). Also published in German as Haute Route: Von Chamonix nach Zermatt/Saas Fee, .

External links
 Information on The Haute Route: Videos, guided and self-guided trips
 Haute Route Chamonix – Zermatt – General presentation and detailed routes – French

Alps
Ski mountaineering
Hiking trails in Switzerland
Mountaineering in Switzerland
Hiking trails in France
Mountaineering in France